is a Japanese middle-distance runner competing primarily in the 800 metres. He represented his country at the 2016 Summer Olympics without advancing from the first round. In addition, he won the bronze medal at the 2015 Asian Championships.

His personal best in the event is 1:45.75 set in Tokyo in 2014. This is the current national record.

International competitions

References

1993 births
Living people
Sportspeople from Nagano Prefecture
Japanese male middle-distance runners
Olympic male middle-distance runners
Olympic athletes of Japan
Athletes (track and field) at the 2014 Asian Games
Athletes (track and field) at the 2018 Asian Games
Athletes (track and field) at the 2016 Summer Olympics
Asian Games bronze medalists for Japan
Asian Games medalists in athletics (track and field)
Medalists at the 2018 Asian Games
Competitors at the 2013 Summer Universiade
Japan Championships in Athletics winners
Nihon University alumni
21st-century Japanese people